Caroly is a yawl, active as a sail training vessel for the Italian Navy.

History 
Designed by Vincenzo Vittorio Baglietto, Caroly is a Bermudan-rig yawl, built in wood, commissioned by Riccardo Preve in 1948 and named after his wife Carolina. The Ligurian family continued to own Caroly up until 1982, where she was then donated to the Marina Militare to be used as a training ship for the students of the Italian Naval Academy of Livorno. In restored years 1998/1999.

References

External links
Caroly (A 5302) Marina Militare website

1948 ships
Ships built in La Spezia
Yawls
Sail training
Training ships of the Italian Navy
Tall ships of Italy